Rhododendron discolor (喇叭杜鹃) is a rhododendron species native to many regions of China, where it grows at altitudes of . The flowers are pale pink to white. According to Flora of China, "Rhododendron discolor intergrades with R. fortunei, and can reliably be separated from that species only by the proportionately narrower leaves."

References

 Franchet, J. Bot. (Morot). 9: 391. 1895.

discolor